Jan Bornman is a South African professional rugby union player. He currently plays at flanker for Castres in the Top 14.

Honours

Club 
 Castres
Top 14: 2012–13

References

External links
Ligue Nationale De Rugby Profile
European Professional Club Rugby Profile

South African rugby union players
Rugby union flankers
1980 births
Living people
Griquas (rugby union) players
US Dax players
Castres Olympique players
Rugby union players from the Free State (province)